Khand may refer to:

People
Bal Krishna Khand, a Nepalese politician
Imran Khand, a British businessman

Places

India
 Khanda, a big village in Haryana
 Khand (Bansagar), a town in Madhya Pradesh
 Khanda Kheri, a village in Hisar district, Haryana
 Khand, Mawal, a village in Pune district, Maharashtra
 Khand, Vikramgad, a village in Palghar district, Maharashtra
 Malaj Khand, a city in Balaghat district in Madhya Pradesh

Fictional
 Khand, a country in Middle-earth in J. R. R. Tolkien's legendarium

Other
Muscovado, a type of sugar called khand in Indian English
Pauson–Khand reaction, an organic chemical reaction
Sach Khand, a Sikh religious concept
Khande di Pahul, the Sikh ceremony of initiation also known as Amrit Sanchar

See also
Khanda (disambiguation)
Kanda (disambiguation)
Kenda (disambiguation)
Khonds